Machimia rogifera is a moth in the family Depressariidae. It was described by Edward Meyrick in 1914. It is found in Guyana.

The forewings are light yellow ochreous, suffused with ferruginous along the median portion of the costa. There is a slender black supramedian streak from the base to one-third, the space between this and the dorsum suffused with fuscous. There is also a large dark fuscous trapezoidal blotch extending on the dorsum from the middle to near the tornus, rather narrowed upwards and reaching across wing for four-fifths, edged with black and then with whitish. The hindwings are blackish grey.

References

Moths described in 1914
Machimia